Chung-ang University Business School (CBS) is the undergraduate and graduate business school of Chung-ang University, in Seoul, South Korea. 

Established in 1955, CBS was  the first undergraduate business school in South Korea.

History
CBS started as the Division of Commerce in 1948 when Chung-Ang University was founded. In 1995, the  Division of Commerce was rename the College of Business Administration,

In 1995, CBS ranked 5th in overall evaluation of business, trade, and accounting related departments by the Korean Council for University Education.  In 2006, the Graduate School of Business, offering MBA and executive programs, was established. CBS now offers both undergraduate and graduate study program.

Programs

Undergraduate
CBS offers a bachelor's degree in business administration in Business Administration and Global Finance. Students are required to complete at least 132 credit hours typically in 8 semesters to get their degree. Approximately 1,800 students are enrolled at the undergraduate programs currently.

Graduate (Master's Degree and Ph.D.)
As of the 2004 Spring Semester, there were over 200 students in the CBS business administration master's and Ph.D. program covering finance, accounting, international business, MIS, and management strategy and organization. Students are required to complete at least 30 credit hours to finish their master's degree and 60 credit hours to finish their Ph.D. degree. In addition to course work, students are expected to prepare a thesis and successfully defend their work to completely finish the requirements for both the Master's and Ph.D. degree.

MBA Program
The Graduate school of Business offers MBA and non-degree executive programs. The School offers two MBA programs, CAU-Global MBA and CAU-Leader MBA.

CAU-Global MBA Programs
The objective of CAU-Global MBA program is to train business leaders and managers The program consists of three concentrations; CAU-Fudan, CAU-Fudan&Finance, and CAU-Finance.

CAU-Fudan MBA is a dual degree program jointly operated with Fudan University in Shanghai. Students spend the first year at Chung-Ang University taking core business courses of 24 credit hours and then move to Fudan University to take various courses in Chinese economy and business. Upon successful completion of study in Korea and China, student will be awarded two master's degrees, MBA from CBS and Master of Science in Economics from Fudan University.

CAU-Fudan&Finance MBA has the same structure as CAU-Fudan MBA except for the fact that students take courses in finance and accounting rather than core business courses at CBS.

Students admitted to CAU-Finance MBA program spend two years at CBS and are required to take at least 45 credits to be awarded MBA degree. They take core business courses in the first year with students in CAU-Fudan MBA program and then study advanced and applied topics in finance area in the second year.

CAU-Leader MBA Program 
CAU-Leader MBA is an evening/weekend MBA program offered to part-time students. Students are required to successfully complete at least 45 credits from core and applied courses. CAU-Leader program provides four concentration areas to help students acquire expertise necessary to accomplish career success in each area; Marketing Communication, Media and Entertainment, Financial Information and Asset Management, and General Management.

Clubs
Business and Philosophy (경영과 철학)
Kyungwoo Club (경우회)
Economics Study Club (경제연구회)
CPA Club (공인회계사반)
Kisldong (기슬동)
Nalgae (날개)
Daslgis (다슬기스)
International Trade Study Club (무역연구회)
Vikings (바이킹스)
Arirang (아리랑)
Finance Study Club (재무연구회)
Editorial Board (편집위원회)
Hamsung (함성)
Haeryongdang (해룡당)
Enia (에니아)
Whistle (휘슬)
Marketing Club GML
Sorm (소름)
CAU Korea Club (코리아클럽)

International exchange program
The Division of International Cooperation (DIC) provides a range of year-round services to assist in-country students and faculty members with opportunities for study, teaching, and research abroad through linkages with overseas institutions.

References

Business schools in South Korea
Business School